Joe Biden, a Democrat from Delaware, was elected President of the United States on November 3, 2020. He was inaugurated on January 20, 2021, as the nation's 46th president. The following articles are lists of opinion pollings on his administration:

 2021
 2021 opinion polling on the Joe Biden administration
 2022
 2022 opinion polling on the Joe Biden administration
 2023
 2023 opinion polling on the Joe Biden administration

Presidency of Joe Biden
Opinion polling in the United States